The 1873 Washington and Lee Generals football team represented the Washington and Lee University in the 1873 college football season, the school's first season of football.  Their four-game season featured four wins over VMI including its earliest victory and the first game in the South, a 4–2 win. The team has no known coach.

Schedule

See also
 List of the first college football game in each US state

References

Washington and Lee
Washington and Lee Generals football seasons
College football undefeated seasons
Washington and Lee Generals football